Wolf-Rüdiger Krause (born 7 September 1944) is a German football coach and a former player. As a player, he spent two seasons in the Bundesliga with Eintracht Braunschweig.

Honours
 Bundesliga champion: 1966–67

References

External links
 

1944 births
Living people
People from Kołobrzeg
German footballers
Bundesliga players
2. Bundesliga players
Eintracht Braunschweig players
Eintracht Braunschweig II players
Eintracht Braunschweig managers
VfL Wolfsburg players
German football managers
VfL Wolfsburg managers
Association football forwards
People from the Province of Pomerania
Sportspeople from West Pomeranian Voivodeship
West German footballers
West German football managers